Diplopora is an extinct genus of marine dasycladacean algae in the family Diploporaceae.

Fossil records
This genus is known in the fossil records from the Silurian to the Jurassic (from about 426.2 to 155.7 million years ago). Fossils of species within this genus have been found in Europe, Iran, Japan, Mexico, Russia, Iraq and United States.

Species
Species within this genus include:
 †Diplopora oregonensis E. Flügel et al.
 †Diplopora permica Korde 1965
 †Diplopora annulata Schafhäutl

References 

Ulvophyceae
Prehistoric plant genera
Triassic plants
Fossil algae
Silurian first appearances
Jurassic extinctions
Prehistoric plants of North America